Aminul Islam is an Indian politician . He was elected to the Assam Legislative Assembly from Mankachar in the 1985 Assam Legislative Assembly election. He got reelected for the term during 1996–2001.

References

Living people
National People's Party (India) politicians
Year of birth missing (living people)
Bharatiya Janata Party politicians from Assam